"The White Ship" ("Белый пароход") is a novella written by Kyrgyz writer Chinghiz Aitmatov. It was first published in 1970 in Novy Mir, accompanied by a film adaptation of the novel titled The White Ship which was released in 1976.

Plot summary 
"The White Ship" is a story of a young boy who grows up with his grandfather, Momun, on the shores of Issyk-Kul Lake. He spends time exploring, listening to legends from his grandfather, and looking out over the lake as white ships sail along. He finds particular interest in the stories that his grandfather tells him about the Horned Mother Deer that is sacred to the Bogo tribe. A series of tragedies occurs at the end of the novella, and a hunting party kills a sacred deer with Momun and the boy as witnesses. This sends the boy into despair. Longing for love and acceptance, he dives into the waters of a stream nearby to "turn into a fish" and swim towards Issyk-Kul in search of his father.

A controversy surrounded the novel after publication due to its graphic and violent depictions of Soviet "heroes" as well as hints of child suicide.

English translation of the story available in print 
The White Steamship, translated by Tatyana & George Feifer, Hodder & Stoughton, 1972

The White Ship, translated by Mirra Ginsburg, Crown Publishers Inc., New York, 1972

References

Kyrgyzstani novels
Soviet novellas
Books by Chinghiz Aitmatov
Fictional Kyrgyzstani people